The men's light middleweight (71 kg/156.2 lbs) Low-Kick category at the W.A.K.O. World Championships 2007 in Belgrade was the sixth heaviest of the male Low-Kick tournaments, involving seventeen fighters from three continents (Europe, Asia and South America).  Each of the matches was three rounds of two minutes each and were fought under Low-Kick rules.

As there were not enough fighters for a tournament designed for thirty-two, fifteen of the fighters received a bye through to the second round.  The tournament winner was Russia's Konstantin Sbytov who claimed gold by defeating K-1 MAX fighter and 2004 W.A.K.O. European amateur champion Michal Glogowski from Poland.  Paolo Iry from France and Milan Dragojlovic from Serbia won bronze medals.

Results

Key

See also
List of WAKO Amateur World Championships
List of WAKO Amateur European Championships
List of male kickboxers

References

External links
 WAKO World Association of Kickboxing Organizations Official Site

Kickboxing events at the WAKO World Championships 2007 Belgrade
2007 in kickboxing
Kickboxing in Serbia